Lascahobas is an arrondissement in the Centre department of Haiti. As of 2015, the population was 168,685 inhabitants. Postal codes in the Lascahobas Arrondissement start with the number 53.

The arondissement consists of the following communes:
 Lascahobas
 Belladère
 Savanette

References

Arrondissements of Haiti
Centre (department)